Mere Khudaya is a Pakistani drama serial aired on ARY Digital. It is written by Samina Aijaz and directed by Shahood Alvi. It is produced by Abdullah Seja under their production banner Idream Entertainment.

Cast 

 Saboor Aly as Mehak
 Shahood Alvi as Sajid
 Zubab Rana as Aleena
Hassan Niazi as Qasim
 Paras Masroor as Kashif; Aleena's brother
 Sajida Syed
 Salma Hassan
 Shaheen Khan as Aleena's mother
 Sohail Asghar as Zahid; Mehak's father
 Shaista Jabeen

Awards and nominations

References

External links 
Official website

2018 Pakistani television series debuts